Olearia revoluta is a species of flowering plant in the family Asteraceae and is endemic to the south-west of Western Australia. It is an erect, rounded shrub with linear to oblong leaves with the edges rolled under, and white daisy-like inflorescences.

Description
The heads or daisy-like "flowers" are arranged in leaf axils and are sessile or on a short peduncle with an oval to top-shaped involucre at the base. Each head has 4 to 8 white ray florets surrounding 6 to 10 disc florets. Flowering occurs between May and November.

Taxonomy 
Olearia revoluta was first described in 1867 by George Bentham in Flora Australiensis from specimens collected by Augustus Oldfield between the Murchison and southern Hutt Rivers. The specific epithet (revoluta) means "revolute", referring to the edges of the leaves.

Distribution and habitat
This olearia grows in sand over sandstone, on the sandplains toward Geraldton and beyond Esperance in the Avon Wheatbelt, Esperance Plains, Geraldton Sandplains and Yalgoo bioregions of south-western Western Australia.

Ecology 
The seeds are harvested by the western rosella subspecies Platycercus icterotis icterotis.

References

revoluta
Endemic flora of Western Australia
Asterales of Australia
Taxa named by George Bentham
Plants described in 1867